New York State Route 438 (NY 438) is a north–south state highway located entirely in Erie County, New York, in the United States. The southern terminus of the route is at an intersection with U.S. Route 62 (US 62) and NY 39 in Gowanda. Its northern terminus is at a junction with US 20 and NY 5 in Irving. The route was assigned in the mid-1940s. Although it is signed as a state route, the state does not maintain any of the route.

Route description

NY 438 begins at an intersection with US 62 and NY 39 in northern Gowanda. The route heads north, inheriting the Buffalo Street moniker from US 62 and NY 39, which turn east at NY 438's southern terminus. Outside of the village in Collins, the route becomes Four Mile Level Road as it curves westward into the Cattaraugus Indian Reservation. During this stretch, NY 438 intersects both Versailles–Plank Road and Brant Road (southern terminus of County Route 9 or CR 9) and crosses over the narrow Clear Creek.

As it approaches Irving, NY 438 becomes Irving–Gowanda Road, named for the communities at each terminus. The route heads northwest across undeveloped but level terrain, crossing over the New York State Thruway (Interstate 90) without connecting to the highway. NY 438 comes to an end shortly afterward at a junction with US 20 and NY 5 northeast of Irving in the town of Brant. Access to the Thruway is made via exit 58, located a mile (1.6 km) to the southwest on US 20 and NY 5 in Irving, a hamlet in the adjacent Chautauqua County town of Hanover.

Unlike most state routes, NY 438 is entirely locally maintained. The Seneca Nation of Indians, the tribe with jurisdiction over the Cattaraugus Reservation, maintains all of the road on the reservation (which is all of the road except the southernmost , which lies outside the reservation bounds). The southernmost  of the route is within the village of Gowanda and is maintained by the village.

History
NY 438 was assigned to the entirety of its current alignment in the mid-1940s. The bridge carrying NY 438 over the New York State Thruway,  in length, was constructed in 1958. Farther east, the  bridge over Clear Creek was originally built in 1935 and reconstructed in 1992.

Major intersections

See also

References

External links

438
Transportation in Erie County, New York